Ortwin De Wolf (born 23 April 1996) is a Belgian professional footballer who plays as a goalkeeper for Antwerp in the Belgian First Division A. He previously played for Lokeren and Eupen.

Club career
Ortwin De Wolf started his career with Lokeren. He moved to Eupen on 20 July 2019.

On 5 July 2021, he moved to Antwerp on a permanent basis after playing for them on loan in the previous season and signed a three-year contract.

References

External links
 

1996 births
People from Lokeren
Living people
Belgian footballers
Association football goalkeepers
Belgium under-21 international footballers
K.S.C. Lokeren Oost-Vlaanderen players
K.A.S. Eupen players
Royal Antwerp F.C. players
Belgian Pro League players
Challenger Pro League players
Footballers from East Flanders